Adrian Alonso Martínez Batista (born 15 October 1998) is a Costa Rican professional footballer who plays as a winger for Belgian First Division B club Lommel, and the Costa Rica national team.

Club career
On 18 August 2021, Martínez joined Belgian First Division B club Lommel on a five-year deal, returning to Alajuelense until the end of the year.

International career
Martínez was called up to the Costa Rica national team on 9 May 2021 for the 2021 CONCACAF Nations League Finals, and was included in the final 23 on 25 May. He made his debut on 3 June 2021 in a semi-final against Mexico.

He had also played for the U-23 team for the 2020 Summer Olympics qualifying, debuting on 18 March 2021, with a 1–0 defeat to the United States U-23.

Honours
Alajuelense
Liga FPD: Apertura 2020
CONCACAF League: 2020

References

1998 births
People from Puntarenas
Living people
Costa Rican footballers
Costa Rica international footballers
Association football wingers
Puntarenas F.C. players
L.D. Alajuelense footballers
Guadalupe F.C. players
Lommel S.K. players
Liga FPD players
Challenger Pro League players
2021 CONCACAF Gold Cup players
Costa Rican expatriate footballers
Expatriate footballers in Belgium
Costa Rican expatriate sportspeople in Belgium